The Soyuz 40 mission was a 1981 Soviet crewed spaceflight and the final flight of the Soyuz 7K-T spacecraft. It was a collaboration between the Soviet Union and Romania.

Crew

Backup crew

Mission parameters
Mass: 6800 kg
Perigee: 198.1 km
Apogee: 287 km
Inclination: 51.6°
Period: 89.06 minutes

Mission highlights
Soyuz 40 was the 16th expedition to Salyut 6 and carried the ninth international crew. It also ended the first phase of the Intercosmos program by carrying Romanian cosmonaut Dumitru Prunariu and Soviet cosmonaut Leonid Popov to the station. In all, nine Intercosmos missions were launched between 1978 and 1981.

Soyuz 40 was the last of the original Soyuz spacecraft (due to its replacement by the Soyuz-T) and the last Soyuz spacecraft to dock with Salyut 6. During the crew's stay, Prunariu studied the Earth's magnetic field. Earth observations had to be delayed until the last day of the flight, when Salyut 6 passed over Romania in daylight. During this time the crew also tested the station's orientation system.

See also

List of human spaceflights to Salyut space stations
List of Salyut expeditions

References

Crewed Soyuz missions
Spacecraft launched in 1981
1981 in the Soviet Union
Romania–Soviet Union relations
1981 in Romania
Spacecraft which reentered in 1981